Menander is an Anglicized form of the Greek , Menandros, "staunch man" or "abiding man." It may refer to:

Persons
 Menander, Greek dramatist
 Menander (general), general of Alexander the Great
 Menander I, Indo-Greek king
 Menander II, Indo-Greek king 
 Menander of Laodicea, Greek rhetorician
 Menander Protector, Byzantine historian and ethnographer
Menander of Ephesus, (c. early 2nd century BCE), wrote a history of Tyre, Lebanon
 Menander (gnostic), a student of Simon Magus and his successor as leader of Simonianism

Other
 The House of Menander, in Pompeii, named for its fresco of a poet
 Menander (butterfly), a genus of metalmark butterflies in the tribe Nymphidiini